The Orson Welles Show (1941–42), also known as The Orson Welles Theater, Orson Welles and his Mercury Theater and the Lady Esther Show (after its sponsor), was a live CBS Radio series produced, directed and hosted by Orson Welles. Broadcast Mondays at 10 p.m. ET, it made its debut September 15, 1941. Its last broadcast was February 2, 1942.

History
Sponsored by Lady Esther cosmetics, The Orson Welles Show presented dramatic adaptations, poetry, history, music, comedy, and a commentary segment by Welles titled "Almanac." Nineteen broadcasts were produced. 

Created each week with the same basic crew, The Orson Welles Show featured music by Bernard Herrmann and a regular cast that included Conrad Binyon, Hans Conried, Dolores del Río, Brenda Forbes and Blanche Yurka. On many of the shows, Cliff Edwards recreated the voice of Jiminy Cricket and bantered with Welles between segments. Most of the series was produced while Welles was shooting his second feature film, The Magnificent Ambersons (October 28, 1941 – January 31, 1942), and many of the cast participated in The Orson Welles Show.  On January 6, 1942, Welles also began filming Journey into Fear.

The November 17, 1941, broadcast marked the debut of The Hitch-Hiker, an original radio play by Lucille Fletcher (wife of Bernard Herrmann) that has become a classic of suspense. On the broadcast of December 29, 1941, Rita Hayworth was the guest player; this was the first meeting between Welles and Hayworth, who were married in September 1943.

Welles concluded the final broadcast of The Orson Welles Show February 2, 1942, with a statement: "Tomorrow night the Mercury Theatre starts for South America. The reason, put more or less officially, is that I've been asked by the Office of the Coordinator of Inter-American Affairs to do a motion picture especially for Americans in all the Americas, a movie which, in its particular way, might strengthen the good relations now binding the continents of the Western Hemisphere."

Episodes

Notes

References

External links
 Orson Welles Show at the Internet Archive

1941 radio programme debuts
1942 radio programme endings
1940s American radio programs
American radio dramas
CBS Radio programs
Works by Orson Welles